Henry Cochrane may refer to:

Henry Clay Cochrane (1842–1913), United States Marine Corps general
Sir Henry Cochrane, 1st Baronet (1836–1904), of the Cochrane baronets
Sir (Henry) Marc Sursock Cochrane, 4th Baronet (born 1946), of the Cochrane baronets

See also
Cochrane (surname)
Matthew Henry Cochrane (1823–1903), Canadian industrialist, livestock breeder, and politician